The John and Amanda Bigler Drake House is a historic residence located west of Winterset, Iowa, United States.  The Drake's settled  in Madison County in 1853.  Within five years he had acquired  of land.  This house was built around 1856.  It is an early example of a vernacular limestone farmhouse. This two-story structure has a two-story addition composed of locally quarried ashlar and rubble stone.  It features a lintel course, a protruding water table, the main entryway has an elaborate transom and sidelights, and stone chimneys on both gable ends.  The house was listed on the National Register of Historic Places in 1987.  When the house was nominated for the National Register it was still owned by the Drake family.

References

Houses completed in 1856
Vernacular architecture in Iowa
Houses in Madison County, Iowa
National Register of Historic Places in Madison County, Iowa
Houses on the National Register of Historic Places in Iowa